Botho Makubate (born 16 May 1990) is a Botswana female badminton player.

Achievements

BWF International Challenge/Series
Women's Doubles

 BWF International Challenge tournament
 BWF International Series tournament
 BWF Future Series tournament

References

External links 
 

Living people
1990 births
Botswana female badminton players
Competitors at the 2011 All-Africa Games
Competitors at the 2015 African Games
African Games competitors for Botswana